Paper folding most frequently refers to Origami, the art developed in Japan.

Paper folding may also refer to:

 Chinese paper folding, the art developed in China
 Paper model, the craft of making models using cut, folded or glued card
 Paper toys, for example paper planes
 Mathematics of paper folding
 Pop-up book, also known as paper engineering
 Regular paperfolding sequence for example the Dragon curve
 Book folding, how paper is folded industrially